Lindsay is an unincorporated hamlet in Dawson County, Montana, United States, located on Montana Highway 200S and the Upper Sevenmile Creek,  west-northwest of Glendive. The community has a post office with ZIP code 59339, a public school, and a cooperative.

The town is named for Willam Lindsay, an Ohio-born businessman and the first rancher and freighter in the region. In the 1920s, the town moved from its original site when the Northern Pacific Railway built its branch line to Circle.

Demographics

References

Unincorporated communities in Dawson County, Montana
Unincorporated communities in Montana